Alvis Jaunzems (born 16 June 1999) is a Latvian footballer who plays as a right-back defender for Valmiera and the Latvia national team.

Career
Jaunzems made his international debut for Latvia on 3 September 2020 in the UEFA Nations League against Andorra, coming on as a substitute in the 81st minute for Artūrs Zjuzins, with the match finishing as a 0–0 draw.

Career statistics

International

References

External links
 
 
 
 Profile at LFF.lv

1999 births
Living people
Latvian footballers
Latvia youth international footballers
Latvia under-21 international footballers
Latvia international footballers
Association football midfielders
Valmieras FK players
Latvian Higher League players